Ider (Stylized in all-capital letters) are an English singer-songwriter duo from London, United Kingdom, composed of two friends Megan Markwick and Lily Somerville. Their music style combines features of various musical genres, and it has been described as "post-genre" or "cross-genre". Formed in 2016 after its members met at Falmouth University, Ider has released a number of singles, and released their debut EP, Gut Me Like an Animal, in 2017. Their first full-length album, Emotional Education, was released two years later in 2019.

Background
Ider's members, Lily Somerville, who is originally from Tamworth, Staffordshire, and Megan Markwick, who is from North London, met during the first term of their Bachelor of Arts course in Popular Music at Falmouth University in 2012. The pair were put into a group with other music students, but quickly began working as a duo. Throughout university, they formed a friendship and began songwriting together; they also performed together during this time as an acoustic folk duo called "Lily & Meg". As Lily & Meg, they released some singles, including "I'll Be Yours", and two EPs. They eventually moved to London, where they now share a flat. It was after they graduated from Falmouth in 2016 that they released their first single as Ider, Sorry. In 2017, they were signed to Glassnote Records.

Having previously joked that "Ider" is an alter ego which "manifests itself when [they] harmonise", Somerville and Markwick have stated that the band's name is an invented name that they decided to call themselves.

Markwick and Somerville have cited Joni Mitchell, Fleetwood Mac, The Beatles, Bruce Springsteen, Jeff Buckley, Beyoncé, Etta James, Dido, Gillian Welch and Nina Simone as influences.

Members

Band members
 Elizabeth 'Lily' Somerville – lead vocals, backing vocals, guitar, keyboard and synth
 Megan 'Meg' Markwick – lead vocals, backing vocals and synth

Studio musicians
 Ben Scott – drums

Live musicians
 Mike Park – drums

Concert tours

Headlining
 2019 World Tour
 2020 US & Canada Tour
 2020 UK & EU Tour
 2022 UK & EU Tour

Supporting
 Tegan and Sara – European Love You To Death Tour (2016)
 Ibeyi – UK Tour (2017)
 Oh Wonder – European Ultralife Tour (2017)
 Sigrid – UK & EU Tour (2019)

Discography

As main artist

Albums

EPs

As Lily and Meg

As Ider

Singles

Remixes

As featured artist

Soundtracks

Music videos

Awards and nominations

References

English women singer-songwriters
English performance artists
Living people
Musical groups from London
People from Tamworth, Staffordshire
Alumni of Falmouth University
21st-century English women singers
21st-century English singers
Year of birth missing (living people)
Glassnote Records artists